Joseph Harry Guy Carbonneau (born March 18, 1960) is a Canadian former professional ice hockey player, coach and executive in the National Hockey League. He was also the president of the Quebec Major Junior Hockey League Chicoutimi Saguenéens. Carbonneau was inducted into the Hockey Hall of Fame in November 2019.

Playing career
Carbonneau started his hockey career in the Quebec Major Junior Hockey League with the Chicoutimi Saguenéens. After an impressive 182-point season with the Sagueneens, Carbonneau was drafted 44th overall in the 1979 NHL Entry Draft by the Montreal Canadiens. His strong play as a defensive forward helped the Canadiens to a Stanley Cup championship in 1985–86, followed by three Frank J. Selke Trophy wins in 1987–1988, 1988–1989, and 1991–1992. In 1989–1990, he was named the captain of the Canadiens, and led them to another Stanley Cup win in 1992–93 against Wayne Gretzky and the Los Angeles Kings. On August 19, 1994, he was traded to the St. Louis Blues in exchange for Jim Montgomery. He played there for one season before moving to the Dallas Stars. He won his third Stanley Cup in 1998–1999 with the Stars. Next season, Carbonneau and the Stars reached the Stanley Cup Finals again but this time they lost to the New Jersey Devils. Carbonneau retired shortly after that.

Carbonneau was one of the more popular Canadiens; fans chanted "Guy, Guy, Guy!" whenever he touched the puck, much as they did for Guy Lafleur (with whom Carbonneau played from 1982–1985) during his career. He was also one of the most admired Dallas Stars players. He took the ceremonial opening faceoff for the Stars when they played the Canadiens at the last game at the Montreal Forum.

Post-playing career

In 2005, the Quebec Major Junior Hockey League created the Guy Carbonneau Trophy (Trophée Guy Carbonneau), awarded annually to the player in the QMJHL judged to be the best defensive forward.

After serving as an assistant coach to Michel Therrien with the Canadiens from 2000 to 2002, Carbonneau moved back to the Dallas Stars where he worked as an assistant general manager (he was named to the position on May 26, 2002), until his return to Montreal in January 2006.

On January 14, 2006, Carbonneau became the Montreal Canadiens associate coach, as Claude Julien was fired and GM Bob Gainey assumed the role of interim head coach. Carbonneau became head coach, after the Canadiens were eliminated from the playoffs. He was the 28th coach of the Montreal team.

On April 30, 2008, he was named a candidate for the Jack Adams Award awarded to the best head coach of the year, but lost by 12 points to Washington Capitals coach Bruce Boudreau.

On March 9, 2009, he was fired as the head coach of the Montreal Canadiens with 16 games left. He was replaced by general manager Bob Gainey.

On September 17, 2009, Carbonneau became an analyst for CBC Sports Hockey Night in Canada. He left CBC after the 2009–2010 season and joined Réseau des sports as an analyst. He also appeared in the first season (2010) of La série Montréal-Québec as the head coach for the Montreal team.

On February 7, 2011, Carbonneau became head coach of the Chicoutimi Saguenéens, the team he co-owns. He resigned in July 2011.

On June 25, 2019, Carbonneau was elected to the Hockey Hall of Fame.

Awards and achievements

 Coach, Canadian national team, Maccabiah Games 2017, Gold medal winner.
 Elected to the Hockey Hall of Fame 2019.

Career statistics

Regular season and playoffs

Coaching career

References

External links
 
 Genealogy : Guy Carbonneau

1960 births
Canadian ice hockey centres
Canadian ice hockey coaches
Chicoutimi Saguenéens coaches
Chicoutimi Saguenéens (QMJHL) players
Dallas Stars players
Frank Selke Trophy winners
Hockey Hall of Fame inductees
Ice hockey people from Quebec
Living people
Montreal Canadiens coaches
Montreal Canadiens draft picks
Montreal Canadiens players
National Hockey League All-Stars
Nova Scotia Voyageurs players
People from Sept-Îles, Quebec
St. Louis Blues players
Stanley Cup champions